Asmar Latin Sani, from West Sumatra, was the suicide bomber who detonated the car bomb in the August 5 2003 Marriott Hotel bombing. His severed head was later found on the fifth floor of the building.

Before the Marriott Hotel bombing Azhari Husin was known to have stayed with him, at his Bengkulu home on the island of Sumatra Indonesia.

On May 5, 2006 the International Crisis Group released a report  entitled Terrorism in Indonesia. It described the events leading up the attack;
In January 2003, Rais, Noordin and Azhari moved to Bengkulu, where a group of JI members lived, including Asmar Latin Sani, who became the Marriott suicide bomber. Noordin and Azhari planned the bombing there as a way of putting the explosives to good use. JI members in Bengkulu, Lampung, and Riau were involved in some planning and logistical support but were not told the target. Interestingly, Noordin began to plan for a spectacular attack with some of the Bengkulu members just as others from their wakalah were taking part in a program to refresh their military skills, as a response to the exposure and arrests that followed the Bali bombings. For most of the top JI leadership, this was a time for training and consolidation – not new attacks. But Hambali had set the precedent of going off on his own, and Noordin followed it.

The next stages of the operation involved small teams with ties to one another beyond the JI affiliation. Getting the explosives from Dumai to Bengkulu via Pekanbaru, Riau, in February 2003 and securing additional materials such as detonators involved Noordin, Azhari, Rais, Toni Togar, and a new team member, Masrizal bin Ali Umar. alias Tohir, another Ngruki alumnus and Luqmanul Hakiem teacher.  He was a close friend of Rais and would have been trusted completely by the others. 

After the explosives reached Bengkulu safely as unaccompanied baggage on an ordinary intercity bus, they were stored at the house of Sardona Siliwangi, another Ngruki student and JI member. At the time the Marriott plot was being hatched, Sardona, who lived in Bengkulu, was working with Asmar Latin Sani to set up a new Ngruki-like pesantren there, and it was he who opened a bank account in March 2003 to facilitate financial transactions for Noordin.

Asmar Latin Sani was a member of Laskar Khos, an Arabic phrase which means "special force", a group is that formed inside the al Qaeda -linked Jemaah Islamiyah group which is believed responsible multiple attacks across Indonesia including the 2002 Bali bombing the 2005 Bali bombing and the Jakarta embassy bombing.

A week after the Marriott attack al Qaeda claimed responsibility via the Arab media station Al Jazeera, saying;
This operation is part of a series of operations that Dr. Ayman al-Zawahiri has promised to carry out,...

...a fatal slap on the face of America and its allies in Muslim Jakarta, where faith has been denigrated by the dirty American presence and the discriminatory Australian presence.

References

External links

"Marriott blast suspects named", CNN
"Marriott Hotel in Jakarta reopens", Xinhua
"Terrorism in Indonesia: Noordins Networks", International Crisis Group
"Combating JI in Indonesia" Ng Boon Yian
Jemaah Islamiyah Shown to Have Significant Ties to al Qaeda*
Terrorism Perpetrated and Terrorists Apprehended

1975 births
2003 deaths
Indonesian Islamists
Jemaah Islamiyah
Indonesian al-Qaeda members
People from West Sumatra
People from Bengkulu
Deaths by car bomb
Suicide bombers
Suicides in Indonesia